The 1967 Cincinnati Bearcats football team represented University of Cincinnati during the 1967 NCAA University Division football season. The Bearcats, led by first-year head coach Homer Rice, participated in the Missouri Valley Conference (MVC) and played their home games at Nippert Stadium.

Schedule

Roster

References

Cincinnati
Cincinnati Bearcats football seasons
Cincinnati Bearcats football